Vujin is a surname. Notable people with the surname include:

Marko Vujin (born 1984), Serbian handball player
Zvonimir Vujin (1943–2019), Yugoslav boxer

Serbian surnames